Ella Mai Howell (born 3 November 1994) is an English singer and songwriter. Her musical career began at London's British and Irish Modern Music Institute in 2014, during which time she auditioned as part of a trio on the 11th season of The X Factor. In 2015, she uploaded a four-track solo EP of originals to SoundCloud titled Troubled, and was discovered on social media by American record producer Mustard and signed with his record label, 10 Summers Records.

From 2016 to 2018, she released three EPs on the label, including Time, Change, and Ready. Her self-titled debut studio album was released in October 2018 and featured the singles "Boo'd Up" and "Trip", which charted in the US Billboard Hot 100 at number 5 and 11, respectively. In 2019, "Boo'd Up" was nominated for two Grammy Awards: Song of the Year and Best R&B Song, winning for the latter, as well as Mai herself being nominated for British Breakthrough Act at the 2019 Brit Awards. At the 2019 Billboard Music Awards, she won three awards, including the award for Top R&B Artist.

Early life
Ella Mai was born on 3 November 1994 to a Jamaican mother and an English-Irish father in London. According to the singer, her mother, a lover of American jazz music, named her after Ella Fitzgerald. Mai moved from London to New York City at the age of 12 when her mother took on a teaching job there. Mai's transition to life in New York City was difficult because she was often bullied for her accent. Mai graduated from Queens High School of Teaching in Glen Oaks, Queens, before returning to England aged 17. She is a fan of Arsenal F.C. and club's legend Thierry Henry.

Career
Ella Mai's singing career began studying at the British and Irish Modern Music Institute London (BIMM London) in 2014. During that time she competed on series 11 of The X Factor as part of a trio, 'Arize', but didn't advance beyond the initial audition for the judges. The group broke up shortly thereafter.

2015–2019: Self-titled debut album
In 2015, Mai uploaded a four-track solo EP of original recorded songs to SoundCloud titled Troubled which was produced by Ella’s high school friend Kyle Dj Kam1 McCullough.. Shortly after the release of Troubled, Mai was discovered on Instagram and signed to DJ Mustard's label, 10 Summers Records and Interscope Records. In February 2016, she released Time, the first in her EP trilogy. The six-track EP included the single "She Don't", which featured Ty Dolla Sign. She released her second EP, Change, in November 2016 and third, Ready, in February 2017. "Boo'd Up", which was featured on the EP, rose in popularity on social media as well as in nightclubs over the next few months. Ella Mai toured with Kehlani on her SweetSexySavage World Tour. After Mai served as the opening act on Kehlani's tour, her music reached a bigger audience and the song grew on radio airplay in the spring of 2018.

On 26 April 2018, she released a music video for "Boo'd Up" after it started to gain popularity. The song became her first top ten song in the US in the following month, deeming it her "breakthrough hit." Rolling Stone wrote that the single is "one of the biggest singles by a breakout female R&B singer in the past 10 years." The single peaked at number five on the US Billboard Hot 100, and broke the record for the most weeks at number one of any song by a woman on the R&B/Hip-Hop Airplay chart. On 14 August, she joined Bruno Mars on the 24K Magic World Tour after Cardi B dropped out.

On 3 August, she released the single "Trip", with an accompanied music video releasing on 18 September. The song peaked at number 11 on the Billboard Hot 100. Ella Mai released her self-titled debut album, a 16-track set featuring "Boo'd Up", on 12 October 2018, with guest appearances from Chris Brown, John Legend, and H.E.R. The album sold 69,000 album-equivalent units with 17,000 coming from pure sales. On 22 October 2018, Mai announced her debut tour set to begin in January 2019.
In November, she made two guest appearances on JID's song "Tiiied", along with 6lack and on Meek Mill's song "24/7", on the albums Dicapiro 2 and Championships respectively. On 18 November, she performed on Saturday Night Live with Jezebel describing Mai as "Pure '90s R&B Heartthrob".

Mai was also nominated for two Grammy Awards: Best R&B Song and Song of the Year with "Boo'd Up", winning for the former. "Boo'd Up" would go onto to win the 2019 Billboard Music Award for Top R&B Song. In 2019, Mai won the Billboard Music Awards for Top R&B Artist and Top Female R&B Artist.
Apart from her music, Mai also performed a sketch on Nickelodeon's All That (which aired on 27 July 2019) called "Boo'd Up", a paranormal parody of The Dating Game, in which she played herself as a contestant looking for a ghost to haunt her family home, but instead of choosing the three suitors offered, she chose her former ghost who came back and she forgave him.

2020–present: Heart on My Sleeve
In 2020, Mai received her third nomination for the Grammy Award for Best R&B Album for her self-titled debut at the 62nd Grammy Awards.

On 2 October 2020, Mai released the single, "Not Another Love Song". On Friday, January 28, 2022, she released "DFMU". On March 28, 2022 Mai announced the title of her second studio album Heart on My Sleeve which was released on May 6, 2022. the album debuted at number 15 on the Billboard 200 making it her second top 20 on the chart.

Artistry
In multiple interviews, Ella Mai names Lauryn Hill, Chris Brown, Brandy, Destiny's Child, Alicia Keys, and Mariah Carey as her biggest influences. Vibe said her "perception of the powerful emotion is kindred to R&B heartthrobs of the '90s, who flooded the radio airwaves with soulful ballads, baby-making tunes, and heart-wrenching break-up anthems." Rolling Stone described her sound as "a British émigré full of self-confidence and an affinity for classic Nineties R&B."

Discography

Studio albums

EPs

Singles

As lead artist

As featured artist

Promotional singles

Other charted songs

Notes

Guest appearances

Tours

Headlining
 Boo’d Up The Tour (2018)
 The Debut Tour (2019-2020)
 Heart On My Sleeve Tour (2023)

Opening act
 Kehlani – SweetSexySavage Tour (2017)
 Ariana Grande – Sweetener World Tour (European Leg) (2019)
 Mary J. Blige – Good Morning Gorgeous Tour (2022)

Awards and nominations

Notes

References

External links
 

1994 births
Living people
21st-century Black British women singers
British hip hop singers
British contemporary R&B singers
English expatriates in the United States
English women singer-songwriters
English people of Irish descent
English people of Jamaican descent
English pop singers
English soul singers
Grammy Award winners
Interscope Records artists
Singers from London
Singers from New York City
The X Factor (British TV series) contestants
Universal Music Group artists
British women hip hop musicians
English women songwriters
Third British Invasion artists